Amtrak operates a fleet of passenger train rolling stock consisting of predominantly custom-built equipment. The active fleet includes some 240 diesel locomotives, 66 electric locomotives, 1,408 passenger cars and 20 Acela Express high-speed trainsets. Amtrak also operates 196 locomotives and railcars owned wholly by state partners.

Current

Locomotives 
Amtrak operates diesel, electric, and dual-mode (diesel or electric) locomotives. Its electric locomotives are confined to the Northeast Corridor and the Philadelphia to Harrisburg Main Line, dual-mode locomotives are only used in the Empire Corridor between Albany and New York, and the diesel locomotives are used in all other areas across in the United States.

Passenger cars 
As of late 2018, Amtrak rostered 1,408 passenger cars of various types. These include coaches, lounges, dining cars, sleeping cars, baggage cars and crew/dormitory cars.

Trainsets

Business cars 

In addition to its regular fleet, Amtrak owns several business and track geometry cars:
 #10001 Beech Grove, an "Amfleet office car" used for official business by the Amtrak president and other VIPs. This unique car has an open observation platform, lounge seating area, dining room, kitchen and 2 sleeping accommodations, as well as has lights, GPS equipment and a camera to inspect tracks for defects. The car was repurposed in 2020 with a LiDAR Laser Measurement System.
 #10002 Corridor Clipper, an Amfleet I-based track geometry car. It is periodically attached to the end of a diesel or electric revenue-running train or is hauled by a locomotive only. The car has a special pantograph that is used to test and measure overhead lines.
 #10003, an unnamed Acela-based track geometry car. It is periodically inserted into an Acela Express consist between a power car (locomotive) and the nearest end car, resulting in a train with two power cars and seven intermediate cars rather than the normal six.
 #10004 American View, a Viewliner-based "inspection car" with rear-facing seats and large glass window at the end of the car that allows passengers to observe the tracks. The car can also be used by maintenance crews to visually inspect the tracks for defects and by the Amtrak president and other executives for official purposes. Originally numbered #2301, the American View is one of the three prototype Viewliner cars and was the last passenger railcar produced by Budd.
 #10005, an unnamed catenary measurement car. Like car #10002 Corridor Clipper, this car has a special pantograph that is used to test and measure overhead lines.
 #10020 Pacific Bend, a heritage Pacific-series 10-6 sleeper formally used by Union Pacific, now converted for crew use on special trains. Four roomettes remain for staff use, five roomettes have been converted to storage areas and one has been converted into a shower. The bedrooms have been removed and replaced with a crew lounge.
 #10021 Pacific Cape, a heritage Pacific-series 10-6 sleeper now converted for crew use on special trains. It is usually used along with the Beech Grove for official business by the Amtrak president and other VIPs.
 #9800 Metroliner, a former Metroliner electric multiple unit cafe converted to be used as a first class conference car. Primarily used on charter services on the Northeast Corridor. The car is broken up into 3 areas, one end of the car has 12 business class seats in a 2+1 configuration, the middle has a cafe, and the other end has conference areas (a large private conference room with 8 seats around a large table, 2 medium-sized semi-private conference sections with 4 seats around a table and 2 small semi-private conference sections with 2 seats around a table). The car at one time had cab controls that have since been removed

Former (Amtrak purchased) 
This is a partial listing of locomotives and rolling stock formerly operated by Amtrak. This does not include equipment inherited from private railroads (see #Inherited)

Locomotives

Trainsets

Former (inherited)

Locomotives 

Amtrak inherited numerous locomotives from private railroads on its formation in 1971. Most of these were retired by the end of the decade, if not earlier. These locomotives are enumerated below, with their original owners.

Trainsets and multiple units

Passenger cars

See also
 Amtrak paint schemes
 Budd SPV-2000, Connecticut-owned diesel multiple units which Amtrak operated in the 1980s–1990s

References

External links

 Amtrak Photo Archives
 Fleet Revitalization Plans, Page 3

 
United States railway-related lists
Amtrak